The Horace G. Lyons House is a historic house. It was built in 1860 for Horace G. Lyons, a settler and farmer. It was expanded in 1893. In 1900, Lyons authored a religious booklet called The Devil Problem, in which he argued that the devil could be found in every man. The house remained in the Lyons family until 1977.

The house was designed in the Second Empire and Italianate architectural styles. It has been listed on the National Register of Historic Places since August 1, 1984.

References

Houses on the National Register of Historic Places in Kansas
National Register of Historic Places in Shawnee County, Kansas
Italianate architecture in Kansas
Second Empire architecture in Kansas
Houses completed in 1860